Sverre, Sverrir or Sverri is a Nordic name from the Old Norse Sverrir, meaning "wild, swinging, spinning". It is a common name in Norway, Iceland and the Faroe Islands; it is less common in Denmark and Sweden. It can also be a surname. Sverre may refer to:

First name

Sverre
Sverre of Norway (c. 1145/1151 – 9 March 1202) 
Prince Sverre Magnus of Norway (born 3 December 2005)
Sverre Farstad, Norwegian speed skater
Sverre Fehn (1924–2009), Norwegian architect
Sverre Hassel, Norwegian
Sverre Anker Ousdal, Norwegian actor
Sverre Petterssen, Norwegian
Sverre Steen, Norwegian history professor
Sverre Stenersen, Norwegian
Sverre Seeberg, Norwegian

Sverri
Sverri Sandberg Nielsen (born 1993) a Faroese rower
Sverri Patursson (1871–1960), a Faroese writer

Sverrir
Sverrir Garðarsson, Icelandic
Sverrir Gudnason, Swedish
Sverrir Hermannsson, Icelandic

Last name
Johan Sverre (actor)
Johan Sverre (sports official)

References 

Faroese masculine given names
Norwegian masculine given names